Hilde Jager (born 20 December 1997) is a Dutch judoka. She competed at the 2021 World Judo Championships.

References

External links
 

1997 births
Living people
Dutch female judoka
Sportspeople from Apeldoorn
21st-century Dutch women